Gyrosigma is a genus of diatoms belonging to the family Pleurosigmataceae.

The genus has cosmopolitan distribution.

Species

Species:

Gyrosigma acuminatum 
Gyrosigma aestuarium 
Gyrosigma algoris

References

Naviculales
Diatom genera